Ludmila Cristea (born March 27, 1986 in Ştefan Vodă) is an amateur Moldovan freestyle wrestler, who played for the women's lightweight category. Since 2006, Cristea had won a total of four medals (three silver and one bronze) for the 55 kg class at the European Wrestling Championships.

At age fourteen, Cristea made her official debut, as a judoka, for the 2000 Summer Olympics in Sydney, where she competed in the women's lightweight category (57 kg). Unfortunately, she lost the first preliminary round match to Netherlands' Jessica Gal, who successfully scored a yuko, but incurred a penalty for playing outside the contest area, at four minutes.

Eight years after competing in her first Olympics, Cristea qualified for the  women's 55 kg class this time, as a member of the Moldovan wrestling team, at the 2008 Summer Olympics in Beijing. She defeated Venezuela's Marcia Andrades in the preliminary round of sixteen, before losing out the quarterfinal match to Canadian wrestler and Olympic silver medalist Tonya Verbeek, who was able to score three points each in two straight periods, leaving Cristea without a single point.

References

External links
 
 

Moldovan female sport wrestlers
Moldovan female judoka
1986 births
Living people
Olympic judoka of Moldova
Olympic wrestlers of Moldova
Judoka at the 2000 Summer Olympics
Wrestlers at the 2008 Summer Olympics
People from Ștefan Vodă District
21st-century Moldovan women